David Booysen (born 25 May 1989 in Cape Town, Western Cape) is a South African football (soccer) defender who plays for Steenberg United.

Personal life
His older brother, Mario Booysen, is also a footballer.

References

External links

1989 births
Living people
South African soccer players
Association football defenders
Sportspeople from Cape Town
Cape Coloureds
Maritzburg United F.C. players
Free State Stars F.C. players
Stellenbosch F.C. players
Royal Eagles F.C. players
National First Division players
South African Premier Division players